James Vernon is a British historian.

Vernon studied at the University of Manchester beginning in 1984. At Manchester he also received his Ph.D. and was a professor until 2000, when he was appointed professor of history at the University of California at Berkeley. His teaching there focuses on global and British history. Vernon is noted for his books on 19th century British history, on the history of hunger, and for his attention to questions related to the cultural and postcolonial turns.

Publications 

Monographs

 Politics and the People. A Study in English Political Culture, 1815–1867. Cambridge: Cambridge University Press, 1993 (Paperback 2009)
 Hunger. A Modern History. Cambridge, MA: Harvard University Press, 2007
 Distant Strangers. How Britain Became Modern. Berkeley, CA: University of California Press, 2014
 Modern Britain, 1750 to the Present (volume 4 in Cambridge History of Britain series). Cambridge: Cambridge University Press, 2017

External links 

 Vernon at UC Berkeley

British historians
Living people
Year of birth missing (living people)